A Short Account of the Malignant Fever (1793) was a pamphlet published by Mathew Carey (January 28, 1760 – September 16, 1839) about the outbreak of the Yellow Fever epidemic Yellow Fever Epidemic of 1793 in Philadelphia in the United States. The first pamphlet of 12 pages was later expanded in three subsequent versions.  Local black leaders Absalom Jones and Richard Allen thought that Carey's account did not give sufficient credit to black residents who volunteered as nurses during the outbreak, and published a counter-narrative, “A Narrative of the Proceedings of the Black People During the Late Awful Calamity in Philadelphia (1794). Carey agreed with their assessment and revised his pamphlet a fourth time to present that view.

Background
The city of Philadelphia, the largest city and temporary capital of the United States, suffered a severe yellow fever epidemic in 1793, likely brought by immigrant refugees and ships from Saint-Domingue, where the disease was prevalent and a slave uprising was underway. The city had nearly 50,000 residents and was a major port on the Delaware River.  It was also the seat of the state government.

During that time, Carey, along with many others who had the means, fled the city for weeks to try to escape the disease. The city had a large free black population of 2,000, which in 1787 had established its first mutual aid society, the Free African Society.  It was organizing the first two independent black congregations in the city, each of which opened their churches the following year.

The epidemic in Philadelphia began in July 1793. This was the first major American yellow fever epidemic since the 1690s.  It continued into October, with increasing victims each week.

The city had attracted many French-speaking immigrants and refugees from Saint-Domingue, both whites and their slaves, and free people of color.

Thomas Jefferson wrote to James Madison in the beginning of September, advising him of the disaster the epidemic would cause throughout the city. At the time, the population of Philadelphia was about 45,000. (Other estimates are 50,000.)  Of the residents, an estimated 17,000 were said to have been ill, and nearly 5,000 died.

According to numerous scholars, Dr. Benjamin Rush wrote to Richard Allen, a black preacher and leader of the Free African Society, appealing to him and his people for help.  Rush believed that blacks might have immunity to the disease, as he had read accounts by another doctor of a yellow fever in epidemic in Charleston, in which they were reported as surviving at higher rates  than whites. He appealed to Allen for aid in the epidemic.

References

Further reading
 A narrative of the proceedings of the black people, during the late awful calamity in Philadelphia, in the year 1793: and a refutation of some censures, thrown upon them in some late publications, Absalom Jones (1794)
 An Account of the Malignant Fever Which Prevailed in the City of New-York During the Autumn of 1805 (alternative copies Internet Archive; Google Books) by James Hardie, Southwick & Hardcastle (printer) (1805) (digital copies courtesy of Google Books & Internet Archive)

External links
 Mathew Carey, A Short Account of the Malignant Fever which Prevailed in Philadelphia, 1793 (Philadelphia, 1793), 13-28,65-68,83-92, original document, hosted at University of Oregon.

Pamphlets
1793 books
Yellow fever
History of racism in the United States